"The Final Cut" is the title track from Pink Floyd's 1983 album The Final Cut.

Background

This song tells of a man's isolation, depression, sexual repression and rejection. At the end of the song he attempts suicide but "never had the nerve to make the final cut". The words "behind the wall" in the song are obscured by a shotgun blast. It is a reference to the Floyd's 1979 album, The Wall, and additionally the song may be told from its main character of Pink.

"The Final Cut" is one of four songs (along with "The Hero's Return", "One of the Few", and "Your Possible Pasts") used in The Final Cut that had been previously rejected from The Wall. This song is in the video version of the album The Final Cut Video EP. The song made an appearance as the B-side of the "Selections From The Final Cut" radio promo single (with "Your Possible Pasts" on the A-side.) It also appears in the film Strange Frame.

Personnel
Roger Waters – vocals, bass guitar, acoustic guitar, tape effects
David Gilmour – guitar, backing vocals
Nick Mason – drums, tambourine

with:

Michael Kamen – piano, harmonium, orchestrations

Cultural references
 The album The Dark Side of the Moog VI (1997) by Klaus Schulze and Pete Namlook is subtitled "The Final DAT".

References

1983 songs
Pink Floyd songs
Rock ballads
Anti-war songs
Songs about suicide
Songs about mental health
Songs written by Roger Waters
Song recordings produced by Roger Waters